George William Zeber (born August 29, 1950) is a former professional baseball player. He played parts of two seasons in Major League Baseball from 1977 to 1978 for the New York Yankees. He was used primarily as a backup to second baseman Willie Randolph.

Early life
Zeber graduated from Loara High School in 1968, and was drafted into the United States Army in 1970 and deployed to Vietnam during the Vietnam War in March 1971. He spent five months in the Quang Tri area and was discharged from the army in September 1971.

External links
, or Pura Pelota

References

1950 births
Living people
United States Army personnel of the Vietnam War
Baseball players from Pennsylvania
Florida Instructional League Yankees players
Kinston Eagles players
Johnson City Yankees players
Major League Baseball second basemen
New York Yankees players
People from Ellwood City, Pennsylvania
Syracuse Chiefs players
Tacoma Yankees players
Tigres de Aragua players
American expatriate baseball players in Venezuela
West Haven Yankees players
United States Army soldiers